Chris Ealham (born 1965) is a British historian and hispanist. He is specialised in the history of anarchism in Spain.

Biography 
Born in Kent (England) in 1965. He earned a PhD in 1995 from Queen Mary and Westfield College, University of London, reading a dissertation titled Policing the Recession: Unemployment, Social Protest and Law-and-Order in Republican Barcelona, 1930-1936, supervised by Paul Preston.

A former lecturer at Cardiff University and Lancaster University, Ealham, based in Madrid, works as lecturer at Saint Louis University Madrid Campus. A partaker in the often acrimonious debate on Spanish civil war historiography, Ealham argues populist historians have set in motion a pro-Franco revisionism in Civil War studies.

Works 

Author
 
 
 
 
 
 
Editor

References 
Citations

Bibliography

External links 

 

1965 births
Living people
Alumni of Queen Mary University of London
British historians
Historians of anarchism
Historians of the labour movement in Spain